Barrafranca (Latin: Convicinum, Calloniana) is a comune and city in Sicily, southern Italy in the Province of Enna.

A Roman fortification known as Calloniana, in 1529 it was founded by Pietro Barresi, Prince of Pietraperzia, and took the current name from the Barresi family. Pietro was the first Marquis of Barrafranca. His sister married Conrado Branciforte, count of Mazzarino, whose family took possession of the town.

Sights include the Duomo of Barrafranca (18th century, in  late Sicilian Baroque style ) with a painting attributed to Filippo Paladino, and the Benedictine Monastery, another example of late Baroque architecture. The church of Santa Maria dell'Itria houses an Annunciation painted by Mattia Preti. Finally, the church of Maria Santissima della Stella also has interior artworks.

References

Municipalities of the Province of Enna